Bergan Castle is a castle-like nunatak rising to  to the southwest of Mount Dewar in Shotton Snowfield, Shackleton Range. It was photographed from the air by the U.S. Navy, 1967, and surveyed by the British Antarctic Survey, 1968–71. In association with the names of pioneers of polar life and travel grouped in this area, it was named by the UK Antarctic Place-Names Committee in 1971 after Ole Ferdinand Bergan (1876–1956), Norwegian inventor who designed Bergan's "meis" (carrying frames) and rucksacks, patented in Norway in 1909.

References
 

Nunataks of Coats Land